Miodrag "Mija" Stefanović (20 October 1922 – 1 December 1998) was a Serbian basketball player, coach and referee. He represented the Yugoslavia national basketball team internationally.

Playing career 
Stefanović played for Belgrade-based team Crvena zvezda of the Yugoslav First League. With the Zvezda, he won the National Championships in the 1946 season. In the 1946 Zvezda season, Stefanović averaged 3.4 points per game while appearing in all 7 games.

National team career
Stefanović was a member of the Yugoslavia national team which participated at the 1947 FIBA European Championship in Prague, Czechoslovakia. He played one game at the tournament and scored 2 points.

Coaching career 
Stefanović coached Partizan during the 1953 season in the Yugoslav First League.

National teams 
Stefanović coached the Austria men's national team at the EuroBasket 1951.

Stefanović coached the Yugoslavia women's national team at two European Women's Basketball Championships (1962 and 1964).

Referee career  
Stefanović was a referee at the 1952 Summer Olympics. After the tournament, he retired.

Career achievements and awards 
 Yugoslav League champion: 1 (with Crvena zvezda: 1946).

See also 
List of KK Partizan head coaches

References

External links

1922 births
1998 deaths
Guards (basketball)
KK Crvena zvezda players
KK Partizan coaches
BKK Radnički coaches
Serbian basketball referees
Serbian expatriate basketball people in Austria
Serbian expatriate basketball people in Tunisia
Serbian men's basketball players
Serbian men's basketball coaches
Yugoslav men's basketball players
Yugoslav basketball coaches
1942 Belgrade Basketball Championship players
Place of birth missing
Place of death missing